Noah Raford (born 3 May 1978 in Charlottesville, Virginia) is an American futurist  and specialist in public policy, strategy and emerging technologies. He is a founding executive of the Dubai Future Foundation and the Museum of the Future, and is currently the Futurist-in-Chief and Chief of Global Affairs at the Dubai Future Foundation. He was responsible for several global and regional firsts, including the world's first fully functional 3D printed building and the first blockchain strategy in the MENA region.

Early life and education 
Raford was born in Charlottesville, United States. He earned a Bachelor in Sociospatial Analysis and Design at Brown University in 2000, and completed his Masters in Advanced Architectural Analysis from the Bartlett School of Architecture at University College London (UCL) in 2004. In 2011, he received his PhD in Urban and Regional Planning from the Massachusetts Institute of Technology (MIT).

Career 
From 2004 to 2009, Raford worked as the North American Director of Space Syntax Limited, the UK architectural and urban planning think tank. From 2008 to 2010, he was the Senior Research Advisor to the Prince’s Foundation for the Built Environment. In 2010, he was a senior strategy consultant at Monitor/Global Business Network.

Raford served as a member World Economic Forum (WEF) Global Agenda Council on Artificial Intelligence and Robotics. He is the former CEO and co-founder of Futurescaper, a cloud-based foresight company founded in 2011.

In 2011, Raford founded the first global foresight in the UAE and served as an advisor to the Director General in the UAE Prime Minister’s Office. In 2016, he became a founding executive of the Dubai Future Foundation, and Acting Executive Director of Museum of the Future, responsible for initiatives including the 3D printed Office of the Future, Dubai 3D Printing Strategy, Dubai Blockchain Strategy, Dubai Global Blockchain Council, Dubai Autonomous Transport Strategy, Dubai Future Accelerators, Dubai Future Academy, Dubai Future Studio, Drones for Good, Courts of the Future Forum and other strategic projects.

His other affiliations include senior research associate at the London School of Economics, research fellowship at the University of Oxford, Said Business School and James Martin 21st Century School, and an honorary faculty position at University College London, the Bartlett School of Architecture.

Talks and panels 

 “UAE Past, Present, Future”, Global Art Forum, 2018.
 “Artificial Intelligence: Our super-intelligent friend?”, Abu Dhabi Ideas Weekend, 2018.
 World Block Chain Forum, 2018.
 “First the Desert, Then the Stars”, NASA Jet Propulsion Laboratory, 2018.
 “Transformative Policy Design”, World Trade Center, Denver, Colorado, 2017.
 Moscow International Open Innovations Forum, 2017.
 “Four Postcards from the Future”, Global Art Forum, 2016.
 TedxDanubia, 2015.
 "Dubai, the most sustainable city", Flux Symposium, 2015.
 “The Future of Cities: Three Scenarios for Future Urbanism” Harvard University, 2010.

Bibliography 

 Raford N, Trabulsi, A, Warlords, Inc.: Black Markets, Broken States, and the Rise of the Warlord Entrepreneur, North Atlantic Books, 2015.
 Raford N, Gupta, N, Lupton, C, The Future We Deserve,  PediaPress GmbH, 2012.
 Raford N, “Online foresight platforms: Evidence for their impact on scenario planning & strategic foresight”,Technological Forecasting and Social Change, Special Issue on Foresight Support Systems, Volume 97, August, 2015.
 Raford N, Crowdsourced Collective Intelligence Platforms for Participatory Scenarios and Foresight”, Journal of Futures Studies, Vo. 17 (1), 2012.
 Raford N, “From Design Fiction to Experiential Futures”,The Future of Futures, Ed. Curry A, Association of Professional Futurists, London, England.
 Raford N and Hillier B, “Measurement and description in socio-spatial analysis”, The Sage Handbook of Measurement, Oxford University Press, 2010.
 Geyer J, Raford N, Pham T, “The Continuing Debate about Safety in Numbers—Data from Oakland, CA”, Proceedings of the 85th Annual Meeting, Transportation Research Board, Washington, D.C., January, 2006.
 Raford N, Ragland R, “Space Syntax: An Innovative Pedestrian Volume Modeling Tool for Pedestrian Safety”, Proceedings of the 83rd Annual Meeting, Transportation Research Board, Washington, D.C., January, 2004.

References 

1978 births
Living people
American futurologists
Brown University alumni
Alumni of The Bartlett
MIT School of Architecture and Planning alumni